Philotheca reichenbachii is a species of flowering plant in the family Rutaceae and is endemic to New South Wales. It is a shrub with upright branchlets, crowded, linear or cylindrical leaves and pink to purple flowers arranged singly or in twos or threes on the ends of branchlets.

Description

Taxonomy
Philotheca reichenbachii was first formally described in 1827 by Sprengel from an unpublished description by Franz Sieber and the description was published in the 17th edition of Systema Vegetabilium.

Distribution and habitat
This philotheca grows in heath in rocky or sandy sites in the Sydney region.

References

reichenbachii
Flora of New South Wales
Plants described in 1827
Taxa named by Kurt Polycarp Joachim Sprengel